Count the Votes is a 1919 American short comedy film featuring Harold Lloyd. It is considered to be lost.

Cast
 Harold Lloyd 
 Snub Pollard 
 Bebe Daniels  
 Sammy Brooks
 Lige Conley (as Lige Cromley)
 Frank Daniels
 Mark Jones
 Gus Leonard
 Marie Mosquini
 Fred C. Newmeyer
 H.L. O'Connor
 Charles Stevenson (as Charles E. Stevenson)
 Noah Young

See also
 List of American films of 1919
 Harold Lloyd filmography
 List of lost films

References

External links

1919 films
1919 comedy films
1919 short films
Silent American comedy films
American silent short films
American black-and-white films
Films directed by Hal Roach
Lost American films
Films with screenplays by H. M. Walker
American comedy short films
1919 lost films
Lost comedy films
1910s American films